The German Timber-Frame Road (German: Deutsche Fachwerkstraße) is a German tourist route leading from the river Elbe in the north to the Black Forest and Lake Constance in the south. Numerous cities and towns each with examples of the vernacular timber-framed houses traditional to the German states are situated along the road.

The route is divided into seven sections, each of which follow the traditional areas of: Lower Saxony, Saxony-Anhalt, Thuringia, Hesse, Bavaria, and Baden-Württemberg.

History
In 1975, the 'ARGE Historische Fachwerkstädte e.V.' (Association of Historic Timber-Framed Towns) was founded. Its aim is to preserve the cultural heritage of a huge variety of different styles of half-timbering in Germany. To share this knowledge with other interested people, the 'German Timber-Frame Road' was founded in 1990. In the meantime, more than 100 timber-framed towns have joined up under the slogan "Timber-framed houses unite".

Sights
The German Timber-Frame Road runs almost the entire length of Germany and therefore links many varied landscapes, historic cities and carefully restored sites and monuments. Numerous events, festivals and markets throughout the year are publicised as part of the route's attractions.

Regional routes

The German Timber-Frame Road is divided into the following seven regional sections, roughly from north to south:

 From the river Elbe to the Weser Uplands (marked blue on the map)
 Stade - Nienburg, Lower Saxony - Bad Essen - Stadthagen - Northeim - Einbeck - Bad Gandersheim - Alfeld

 From the river Elbe plains to the Harz mountains (marked dark red on the map)
 Bleckede - Hitzacker - Dannenberg - Lüchow - Salzwedel - Celle - Königslutter - Wolfenbüttel - Hornburg - Bockenem - Osterwieck - Halberstadt - Wernigerode - Osterode - Duderstadt

 From the Weser Uplands via Northern Hesse to the Vogelsberg mountains and the Spessart mountains (marked brown on the map)
 Hannoversch Münden - Eschwege - Hessisch Lichtenau - Spangenberg - Melsungen - Wolfhagen - Bad Arolsen - Korbach - Fritzlar - Homberg (Efze) - Rotenburg an der Fulda - Bad Hersfeld - Schwalmstadt - Alsfeld - Schlitz - Lauterbach - Grünberg - Lich - Butzbach - Büdingen - Gelnhausen - Steinau an der Straße

 From the Harz mountains to the Thuringian Forest (marked orange on the map)
 Stolberg - Bleicherode - Worbis - Mühlhausen - Wanfried - Treffurt - Bad Langensalza - Vacha - Schmalkalden

 From the river Lahn valley to the Rhine District (marked yellow on the map)
 Dillenburg - Herborn - Wetzlar - Braunfels - Hadamar - Limburg - Bad Camberg - Idstein - Eltville

 From the river Rhine to the river Main and the Odenwald mountains (marked purple on the map)
 Trebur - Dreieich - Hanau-Steinheim - Seligenstadt - Babenhausen - Dieburg - Groß-Umstadt - Wertheim - Miltenberg - Walldürn - Erbach - Reichelsheim

 From the river Neckar to the Black Forest and Lake Constance (marked red on the map)
 Mosbach - Eppingen - Besigheim - Bietigheim-Bissingen - Vaihingen an der Enz - Markgröningen - Marbach - Backnang - Waiblingen - Schorndorf - Esslingen - Kirchheim unter Teck - Bad Urach
 Here the route divides in a western part in the direction of the Black Forest, and a southern part in the direction of Lake Constance:
 - Western Route: From Bad Urach to Herrenberg - Calw - Altensteig - Dornstetten - Schiltach - Haslach
 - Southern route: From Bad Urach to Blaubeuren - Riedlingen - Biberach an der Riß - Pfullendorf - Meersburg

Gallery

See also

 Tourism in Germany

References

External links 

 Official Webpage

German tourist routes
Tourist attractions in Lower Saxony
Tourist attractions in Saxony-Anhalt
Tourist attractions in Hesse
Tourist attractions in Thuringia
Tourist attractions in Bavaria
Tourist attractions in Baden-Württemberg
Timber framed buildings in Germany
Timber framing
Alsfeld